Atalanta Fugiens or Atalanta Fleeing is an emblem book with an alchemical theme by Michael Maier (1568–1622), published by Johann Theodor de Bry in Oppenheim in 1617 (2nd edition 1618). It consists of 50 discourses with illustrations by Matthias Merian, each of which is accompanied by an epigrammatic verse, prose and a musical fugue. It may therefore be considered an early example of multimedia.

The fugues were arranged in three voices symbolizing the philosopher's stone, the pursuing adept, and obstacles in his way. As Florin G. Calian writes,

Title page 
The title page depicts various scenes from Greek mythology related to golden apples: 
 Top: Garden of the Hesperides. 
 Left: Hercules stretching out his arm to seize one of the golden apples.
 Right: Aphrodite handing the golden apples to Hippomenes. 
 Bottom: Race between Atalanta and Hippomenes, with Atalanta picking up an apple. Behind them is a temple with lovers embracing each other, while in the background they appear as a lion and lioness.

Preface 
[[File:Michael Maier Atalanta Fugiens Emblem 39.jpeg|thumb|right|Maier's reinterpretation of the Riddle of the Sphinx as pictured in Emblem 39<ref name=Webinar>Peter Forshaw/Ritman Library - [https://web.archive.org/web/20130803014418/http://www.ritmanlibrary.com/2012/11/infinite-fire-webinar-ii-the-emblemata-of-the-atalanta-fugiens/ Ritman Library Webinar on 'Atalanta Fugiens.], at 48:45</ref>]]
The preface contains a dissertation upon ancient music and narrates the Greek myth of Atalanta and Hippomenes.

 Discourses 
Each of the 50 discourses contains: 
 A detailed copper-plated engraving by Matthias Merian.
 An epigram in verse set to music in the form of a fugue for three voices - Atalanta, or the vox fugiens; Hippomenes, or the vox sequens, and Pomum objectum (Apple) or vox morans''. "Atalanta fugiens" is a play on the word "fugue"
 An epigram in German. 
 A Latin verse with an accompanying discourse.

References

External links 

 Copies at various websites:
 scribd.com (with engravings; without fugues, German epigrams)
 pagesperso-orange.fr (complete scanned text including German epigrams; with appendix, errata; without engravings, fugues)
digital.sciencehistory.org (complete high-resolution scan of a 1618 printing, all pages including engravings and fugues) 
 Images and other media at Wikimedia Commons
 English translation of Epigram Verse at wikisource
 alchemywebsite.com English translation of complete book
 youtube colored prints with instrumental version of the music for each emblem
 Chaitow, Sasha, Atalanta Unveiled: Alchemical Initiation in the Emblems of the Atalanta Fugiens, Attic Books, 2020
Forshaw, Peter J (2010) 'Oratorium-Auditorium-Laboratorium: Early Modern Improvisations on Cabala, Music and Alchemy'.
  Furnace and Fugue. An open-access multimedia resource published by the University of Virginia Press. This English translation of Maier's work features high-resolution, zoomable images and newly commissioned, manipulable vocal recordings of Atalanta’s music. Supported by the Andrew W. Mellon Foundation, the Gladys Krieble Delmas Foundation, and the Office of the Vice President for Research and the Social Science Research Institute at Brown University.

1617 books
1618 books
Alchemical documents
Emblem books
Fugues
Multimedia works
Classical mythology in popular culture